North Branch Mehoopany Creek (also known as North Fork Mehoopany Creek or North Branch Mehoppany Creek) is a tributary of Mehoopany Creek in Bradford County, Sullivan County, and Wyoming County, in Pennsylvania, in the United States. The creek has eight named direct tributaries, including hollows.

North Branch Mehoopany Creek has a deep, narrow valley, with "rough and hilly" topography. The upper reaches of the creek's watershed contain swamps and small lakes. Although forested land is the most prevalent land use in the creek's watershed, agricultural land is also present. A number of bridges have been constructed over the creek. Its watershed is designated as a Coldwater Fishery and a Migratory Fishery. The creek has wild trout naturally reproducing within it.

Course
North Branch Mehoopany Creek begins in Wilmot Township, Bradford County. It flows south for several tenths of a mile, flowing through an unnamed lake, before turning southwest and then south-southeast, entering Colley Township, Sullivan County and crossing Pennsylvania Route 87. After several tenths of a mile, the creek turns east-southeast for several tenths of a mile before receiving the tributary Wolf Run from the left. It then meanders south for a few tenths of a mile to receive the tributary Smith Cabin Run from the right. The creek then flows east, continuing to follow Pennsylvania Route 87. After more than a mile, it turns southeast and then east again for several tenths of a mile. It then turns northeast for several tenths of a mile, receiving the tributary Barnes Brook from the right and the tributary Scotia Brook from the left and turning east.

North Branch Mehoopany Creek then enters North Branch Township, Wyoming County and flows east-northeast for a few miles, still following Pennsylvania Route 87. It receives the tributary Miller Brook from the left and then turns east-southeast for more than a mile, receiving the tributaries Burgess Brook from the left and Douglas Hollow from the right. The creek then turns east-northeast and enters Forkston Township, where it turns east-northeast. After several tenths of a mile, it turns east for several tenths of a mile, receiving the tributary Farr Hollow from the left and turning south. A short distance further downstream, the creek reaches its confluence with Mehoopany Creek.

Hydrology and climate

Geography and geology

The topography of the watershed of North Branch Mehoopany Creek has been described as "rough and hilly". The creek has a deep and narrow valley flanked by steep hills. In the early 1900s, the creek's valley was noted to be very fertile. Near the headwaters, there are swamps and small lakes. The creek has a channel that is sinuous and flows through rock formations consisting of sandstone and shale.

The bedrock in the watershed of North Branch Mehoopany Creek consists entirely of sandstone. The Arnot-Oquaga-Dystrochrepts soil association occurs between North Branch Mehoopany Creek and Mehoopany Creek. In the 2000s, accelerated erosion of streambanks and lateral shifting were identified at five locations on North Branch Mehoopany Creek. This was caused by man-made alterations after Tropical Storm Agnes in 1972 and other flooding events, as well as dredging in the creek. Remedying this would reduce the sediment load of Mehoopany Creek.

Watershed
The mouth of the creek is in the United States Geological Survey quadrangle of Forkston. However, its source is in the quadrangle of Meshoppen. The creek's mouth is located within  of Forkston. The watershed of the creek occupies parts of Wyoming County, Sullivan County, and Bradford County.

There is a  pond known as Saxe Pond in the upper reaches of the watershed of North Branch Mehoopany Creek. The pond has a dam in Wilmot Township, Bradford County. Pennsylvania Route 87 runs alongside the creek for much of its length.

The main land use in the watershed of North Branch Mehoopany Creek is forested land, but there are significant areas of agricultural land as well. The watershed of the creek contains 10 drilled wells and another 14 permitted wells.

North Branch Mehoopany Creek is the largest tributary of Mehoopany Creek, forming approximately a third of the creek's watershed.

History
North Branch Mehoopany Creek was entered into the Geographic Names Information System on August 2, 1979. Its identifier in the Geographic Names Information System is 1193036. The creek is also known as North Fork Mehoopany Creek and North Fork Mehoppany Creek. The latter variant name appears in a 1983 county highway map created by the Pennsylvania Department of Transportation. However, in 1969, civil engineer Ronald W. Hurs was unable to find any evidence that locals referred to the creek as "North Fork Mehoopany Creek". Deeds dating back to about 100 years before that all called the creek "North Branch Mehoopany Creek". North Branch Township probably takes its name from the creek.

The first road in North Branch Township, Wyoming County was built from Forkston up the valley of North Branch Mehoopany Creek. In the early 1900s, the main industry in the watershed of North Branch Mehoopany Creek was agriculture. Major communities in the creek's watershed at the time included Lovelton, with 136 people, and Colley, with 75 people. The creek was used as water power for a gristmill at Lovelton in the early 1900s.

In 1973, a 21-year-old man drowned in North Branch Mehoopany Creek.

When the Mehoopany and Little Mehoopany Creek Watershed Assessment was completed by Borton-Lawson in 2003, North Branch Mehoopany Creek was identified as "problem area" in need of restoration. However, by 2013, projects were being done to stabilize the banks of the creek. The Institute for Energy and Environmental Research was planning on installing a real-time continuous monitor on the creek, but flooding has made these plans uncertain.

Biology
Wild trout naturally reproduce in North Branch Mehoopany Creek from its upper reaches downstream to its mouth. The drainage basin of the creek is designated as a Coldwater Fishery and a Migratory Fishery. In the 1980s, the creek was noted to be best for trout fishing in the early part of the season.

North Branch Mehoopany Creek is stocked with trout. In the 1980s, it was stocked with brook trout, brown trout, and rainbow trout. Stocking occurs in both Wyoming County and Sullivan County. In the 2000s, a total of 31 species of fish were observed in the creek, including darters, daces, suckers, and bluegills.

North Branch Mehoopany Creek is too small to support viable hellbender populations, even at its mouth.

See also
Rogers Hollow, next tributary of Mehoopany Creek going downstream
Bowman Hollow, next tributary of Mehoopany Creek going upstream
List of rivers of Pennsylvania

References

External links
Map of the North Branch Mehoopany Creek watershed

Rivers of Bradford County, Pennsylvania
Rivers of Sullivan County, Pennsylvania
Rivers of Wyoming County, Pennsylvania
Tributaries of Mehoopany Creek